Nes is a Dutch village in the municipality of Heerenveen, Friesland. It is situated in the northern part of the country. Since the village is close to Akkrum, they usually speak about Akkrum-Nes.

History
The mound, on which the belfry (Dutch: Klokkenstoel) stands, is a relic of the monastery Nesser (Nesker Konvent). The monastery was founded around 1200 by the Teutonic Order. The monastery had a lot of land in ownership and has been very important for both the village of Nes, as the extraction and management of the surrounding area. The monastery is at the beginning of the 17th century on decline, the church "St. Nicholas" however, lasted longer, but eventually the church was demolished because it was on decline. Around 1606 it was first talked about Nesserbuïen and from 1700 only one still spoke of Nes.

The old center of Nes is located on the corner of the waterways: The Boorne and Nesser Zijlroede. Until 1877 this was the site for, just south of the Sylsbrêge, the Neskersyl (lock) for centuries. The mound was originally much larger, but in the early 19th century, largely excavated. Since January 1989 the official name of the village is Nes. An aqueduct in the Boorne and a new waterway from the Boarne to the Nesser Zijlroede was realized in 1997. Through this realization arose between the old and new Boarne and the old core of Nes a peninsula. On this peninsula is a new district risen, Boarnstee, with more than 300 houses by the water. At present there is only a belfry on the graveyard mound.

Governance
Until the municipal reorganization on January 1, 1984, Nes made part of the municipality lifted by Utingeradeel, then fell thirty years under Boornsterhem that, because it could never form a unity, decided to redistribute the areas. Since January 1, 2014 Nes is part of the municipality of Heerenveen.

Sights
Nes is known not only for the beginning of the "Turfroute", but also other (free) time activities are possible. Nes is situated in a beautiful natural environment, land and water. For the nature lover, there are opportunities for walking and cycling, and all necessary facilities for living, sports and entertainment are available within walking/biking distance Akkrum.

Population

Notable residents
Foppe de Haan (1943), football coach

References

External links

Heerenveen
Populated places in Friesland